Troy Glasgow (born 11 September 1984) is a British actor.

Career
Troy Glasgow was born in Waterloo, London. He attended the BRIT School in 2001 and graduated in 2003. Whilst there he gained small roles in British television shows such as The Bill, Doctors and Holby City. He gained his first lead role in the Channel 4 one off drama Sex, footballers and videotape. After stints at the National Theatre, Birmingham Rep theatre and a cameo in Adulthood, he went on to appear in Skins, Doctor Who and The Day of the Triffids.

Television

Movies

Theatre
In 2008 Troy originated the role of Tobias Rich in the world premiere of Harper Regan at the National Theatre by British playwright Simon Stephens alongside Lesley Sharp as Harper Regan.

References

External links
 
 

1984 births
Living people
English male television actors
Black British male actors